Rook & Raven was a contemporary art gallery based in Fitzrovia, London. It was co-owned by Richard Grindy & Rachelle Lunnon. Opening in 2011, it closed in 2017.

Artists 

Artists previously shown at Rook & Raven:
 Noma Bar
 Alexis Dahan
 Sarm Derbois
 Camilla Emson
 Corinne Felgate
 Vanessa Garwood
 Manuel Larralde
 Dale Vn Marshall
 Rupert Newman
 Laurence Owen
 William Roper-Curzon
 Lionel Smit
 Erik Sommer
 Bill Wyman (photographs re-worked by artists)
 Vivien Zhang

References 

Defunct art galleries in London
2011 establishments in England
2017 disestablishments in England